The 1974 Kent State Golden Flashes football team was an American football team that represented Kent State University in the Mid-American Conference (MAC) during the 1974 NCAA Division I football season. In their fourth and final season under head coach Don James, the Golden Flashes compiled a 7–4 record (2–3 against MAC opponents), finished in fourth place in the MAC, and outscored all opponents 254 to 161.

The team's statistical leaders included Larry Poole with 1,070 rushing yards, Greg Kokal with 1,265 passing yards, and Ken Dooner with 451 receiving yards. Six Kent State players were selected as first-team All-MAC players: defensive back Cedric Brown, tight end Ken Dooner, defensive end Marvin Elliott, defensive lineman Larry Faulk, running back Larry Poole, and center Henry Waszczuk.

After the season on December 23, James resigned and departed for the University of Washington in Seattle. He was credited with turning a "mediocre" Kent State program into a MAC power in four years; their 9–2 record in 1973 was the best in program history.

Schedule

References

Kent State
Kent State Golden Flashes football seasons
Kent State Golden Flashes football